Skobla is a surname. Notable people with the surname include:

 Jaroslav Skobla (1899–1959), Czechoslovakian weightlifter
 Jiří Skobla (1930–1978), Czechoslovak athlete

Czech-language surnames